Makhzan al-Irfan fi Tafsir al-Quran is a 15 volume tafsir by the Twelver Shia Islamic scholar and the only mujtahida of 20th century Banu Amin.

Banu-ye mujtahedeh Sayyedeh Nusrat Begum Amin al-Tujjar Isfahani, known as Banu Amin, was born in 1886 AD in Isfahan and is said to be descended from Imam Ali ibn Abi Talib through both her parents. At fifteen, she married her cousin, Haj Seyyed Muhammad Amin al-Tujjar, who was a famous businessman in Isfahan. A few years after her wedding, at the age of twenty, she started to study Islamic sciences, such as Fiqh, Usul, tafsir, hadith and hikma, with a private teacher, Ayatollah Mir Muhammad Najafabadi, who tutored her at home. After having spent twenty years of her life studying Islamic sciences, at the age of forty she produced her first work, Arba'in Hashemiya (Forty Hashemi Traditions). This work reached the howza al-'ilmiyah (traditional religious education centre) of Najaf in Iraq, and was warmly approved by the 'Ulama. Banu Amin thus became famous among the 'ulama and reached the degree of Ijtihad. Indeed, after several written examinations from the greatest `ulama of Najaf in Islamic sciences such as fiqh (jurisprudence), hadith (traditions), or Qur'an, she was given permission of Ijtihad (the application of reason to the solution of legal issues) and Istenbat-e ahkam-e shar'i (deduction of the main rules of conduct). She was then the only mujtahedeh (female mujtahed) of her time. Apart from her intellectual activities, Banu Amin also founded a high school for girls (Dabiristan-e Amin) and a religious education centre (Maktab-e Fatemeh). A great number of `ulama used to visit Banu Amin for the purpose of discussing scientific and spiritual subjects. They came from Isfahan, Tehran, Qum, and Najaf, and included Allama `Abd al-Husayn Amini (Kitab al-ghadir), Ayatollah Haeri Shirazi, Ayatollah Safavi Qummi, Allama Tabataba'i (al-Mizan), etc. Banu Amin died in Isfahan on June 16, 1983.

References

Shia tafsir